Matinecock Friends Meetinghouse is a historic Quaker meeting house located on the northwest corner of Piping Rock and Duck Pond Roads in Locust Valley, Nassau County, New York.  It was built in 1725 and is a two-story, rectangular building topped by a steeply pitched gable roof.  It is two bays wide and four bays long, sheathed in shingles.

It was listed on the National Register of Historic Places in 1976.

References

Churches on the National Register of Historic Places in New York (state)
Churches completed in 1725
Churches in Nassau County, New York
Quaker meeting houses in New York (state)
1725 establishments in the Province of New York
18th-century Quaker meeting houses
National Register of Historic Places in Nassau County, New York